La Pine Senior High School, called La Pine High School, is a public high school in La Pine, Oregon, United States.

Academics
In 2008, 70% of the school's seniors received a high school diploma. Of 124 students, 87 graduated, 26 dropped out, and 11 were still in high school in 2009.

Athletics
In 2015, the La Pine wrestling team took the league championships, were the 3A special district 3 dual championships, took second in state as a team, had 14 state placers two state champions tommy gallamore and Derrick Kerr

In 2018, the La Pine Hawks baseball team won the 3A state championship. Coach Bo DeForest led the team to the 4 seed where the Hawks played Horizon Christian in the championship game, winning 10-5. Catcher and Pitcher Wyatt DeForest was honored with the Moda Health Player of the Game

In 2019, the La Pine hawks won their second 3A state championship in a row for baseball. After gaining the 4 seed Coach Bo DeForest led the Hawks to a 8-1 win over Warrenton. Pitcher Adam Plant won the Moda Health Player of the Game.

References

High schools in Deschutes County, Oregon
Public high schools in Oregon
1979 establishments in Oregon
Educational institutions established in 1979